is a Japanese female enka singer. She is affiliated with the talent agency NoReason Inc.

Segawa is 168 cm. in height, comparatively taller than a majority of female singers in Japan. She shares a father with another singer, . Her 1986 single "Inochi Kurenai" reached No.2 on the Japanese Oricon charts and sold 692,000 copies.

Discography 
 : 1970
 : 1986
 : 1990

References

External links
Website 
Official profile at NoReason Inc.

1948 births
Living people
Enka singers
Japanese women singers
Musicians from Shibuya